Levan Mukhranbatoni (1670 – 14 May 1739) was a Georgian nobleman of the House of Mukhrani, a collateral branch of the royal Bagrationi dynasty of Kartli. He was Prince (batoni) of Mukhrani and ex officio commander of the Banner of Shida Kartli and Grand Master of the Household (msakhurt-ukhutsesi) at the court of Kartli from 1719 to 1721.

Levan was the only son of Papua, Prince of Mukhrani, and Princess Tamar Abashidze. He was enfeoffed of Mukhrani in 1719 on the deposition of his uncle, Prince Erekle, by the regent of Kartli, Crown Prince Bakar. Levan was, in turn, deposed in 1721, when King Vakhtang VI of Kartli granted Mukhrani to his reconciled brother, Jesse. Levan went into exile to the Russian Empire, but returned in 1728. 

Levan was married to a certain Elene and fathered nine sons:
 Papuna (1719–1740)
 Levan (born 1719)
 Simon (1726–1785), Prince of Mukhrani
 Ioane (1727–1793)
 Kristepore (fl. 1727 – 1736), Archbishop of Tsilkani
 Ilia (born 1728)
 Edisher (born 1734)
 Mamuka 
 Giorgi (died 1788)

References 

1670 births
1739 deaths
House of Mukhrani
17th-century people from Georgia (country)
18th-century people from Georgia (country)